Finchley is an area of London.

Finchley may also refer to:

 Municipal Borough of Finchley, former local authority
 Finchley (UK Parliament constituency), former constituency best known for being represented by Margaret Thatcher
 Mr. Finchley, a fictional character in three comic novels by Victor Canning
 Sondra Finchley, a character in the 1925 novel An American Tragedy by Theodore Dreiser

See also 
 Finchley Central (disambiguation)